The 1971 Clemson Tigers football team was an American football team that represented Clemson University in the Atlantic Coast Conference (ACC) during the 1971 NCAA University Division football season. In its second season under head coach Hootie Ingram, the team compiled a 5–6 record (4–2 against conference opponents), finished second in the ACC, and was outscored by a total of 202 to 155. The team played its home games at Memorial Stadium in Clemson, South Carolina.

Larry Hefner and end John McMakin were the team captains. The team's statistical leaders included quarterback Tommy Kendrick with 1,040 passing yards, running back Rick Gilstrap with 514 rushing yards, Don Kelley with 505 receiving yards, and John McMakin with 30 points scored (5 touchdowns).

Two Clemson players were selected by the Associated Press as first-team players on the 1971 All-Atlantic Coast Conference football team: offensive end John McMakin, defensive end Wayne Baker, and linebacker Larry Hefner.

Schedule

References

Clemson
Clemson Tigers football seasons
Clemson Tigers football